The 1982–83 Maine Black Bears men's basketball team represented University of Maine in the 1982–83 NCAA Division I men's basketball season. The Black Bears, led by twelfth-year head coach Skip Chappelle, played their home games at Memorial Gymnasium and were members of the America East Conference. Jeff Cross was named the conference player of the year. The Black Bears finished the regular season with a record of 12–14, 6–4 in their conference.

Roster

Schedule

|-
!colspan=12 style=|Eastern Collegiate Athletic Conference North tournament

Players selected in NBA drafts

References 

Maine Black Bears men's basketball seasons
Maine
Maine Black Bears men's basketball
Maine Black Bears men's basketball